The Anna M. Kross Center (AMKC), also known as the C-95 is a jail on Riker's Island used to hold male inmates for the New York City Department of Corrections.

History 
AMKC was completed in 1978, and was initially known as C-95.  It is located on 18-18 Hazen Street, East Elmhurst, NY.   AMKC is spread over 40 acres of land.    It was named for former NY Corrections Commissioner Anna M. Kross,    AMKC is the largest jail on Riker's Island.

Uses
AMKC is currently includes a Methadone Detoxification Unit 
AMKC also houses the Mental Health Center . 
AMKC holds over 2300 inmates per month.

See also
List of jail facilities in New York City

References

Prisons in New York City
Jails in New York City
1978 establishments in New York City
Government buildings completed in 1978
New York City Department of Correction